Lozovo is a village in North Macedonia. It is a seat of the Lozovo municipality

Geography 

Lozovo is a village located in central North Macedonia, on the plains known as Ovče Pole. The village is situated between Veles and Štip.  It is the seat of the Lozovo Municipality.  The coordinates of the city are approximately 41.78 ° N, 21.90° E.

History 
At the end of the 19th century, when the region was part of the Ottoman Empire, the village was part of the Kaza of Štip. At that time, Lozovo was known as Džumajlija. According to data from the Bulgarian historian and ethnographer, Vasil Kanchov, 150 Turks were living in the village. Both Leonhard Schultze-Jena and Dimitar Gadžanov marked Lozovo as a Turkish village.

Economy

Small Enterprises 
Lozovo has numerous small businesses in town. These include 4 small markets/ shops, a boutique, two hardware stores, a small dentistry / primary care office, and a post office. Lozovo also boasts two restaurants situated on the highway- a motel and Restaurant Voz. Each Thursday in the morning, Lozovo hosts a bazaar near the center of town, close to the train stop. Locals and traveling vendors sell produce and miscellaneous items (including clothing, toys, kitchenware, hardware, etc.).

Agriculture 
The main crops of Lozovo primarily include grapes, tobacco, and some wheat.  The red and white grapes are harvested for the production of wine and for eating. Tobacco is harvested in through the autumn months, is threaded/stitched, dried, and sold in March.  Many locals have replaced vineyards with tobacco fields because tobacco has become more profitable than grapes.

Domestically, locals grow vegetables and fruits in their home gardens.  Vegetables can include peppers, cabbage, leeks, tomatoes, beans, carrots, and squash.  Fruit can include apples, pears, plums, figs, quince, and lemons.   Throughout North Macedonia, Lozovo is known for growing the most delicious watermelon.

Husbandry 
Many locals have chickens, goats, and pigs.  A few locals make their living as shepherds.  Local goat walks occur daily through the main street.

Infrastructure

Railway 
The train stops daily in Lozovo (the stop is known as Orce).  The train connects Lozovo to Veles, Skopje and other cities to the west, and to Sveti Nikole, Štip and Kočani to the east.

Roads 
The main road through town is called Marshal Tito. Lozovo straddles the regional road, M-5.

Demography 
According to the last official census of Macedonia (2002), Lozovo counted 896 citizens. The table below shows the nationalities of the citizens during the official censuses.

Culture 
Lozovo hosts its saint's day, on October 27. The town celebrates its patron saint, Saint Petka, with music, dancing, and food at its church. The saint's day draws hundreds of others from the surrounding areas.

Landmarks 
At the center of town is a Turkish minaret and the remnants of a mosque.  

Near the regional road is a beautiful, newly built church.

Visitors to Lozovo will see the tall, distinctive radio tower.

Sports
Local football club FK Rabotnik Džumajlija have played in the Macedonian Third League.

External links 
 Official Site of the Municipality of Lozovo (in Macedonian)

Villages in North Macedonia
Lozovo Municipality